Acid red 88 is an azo dye. Due to its intense colour, solid samples appear almost black. It is used to dye cotton textiles red.  A closely related acid dye is Acid Red 13.

Preparation and use
It can be obtained by azo coupling of naphthionic acid and 2-naphthol. Instead of crystallising, it vitrifies when cooled or salted out of the solution. 
 

This compound is used in the textile industry as a dye. It can also be used for research in photocatalysis (as degradation object).

References

External links 

 echo Chemical Database: 1-Naphthalenesulfonic acid, 4-((2-hydroxy-1-naphthalenyl)azo)-, monosodium salt (EnvironmentalChemistry.com)- This page contains information on the chemical 1-Naphthalenesulfonic acid, 4-((2-hydroxy-1-naphthalenyl)azo)-, monosodium salt including: 72 synonyms/identifiers.

Azo dyes
2-Naphthols